Psilocybe chuxiongensis is a species of psilocybin mushroom in the family Hymenogastraceae. Described as new to science in 2014, it is found in subtropical China. The type specimens, collected in August 2009, were found growing singly to scattered on cow dung. It is generally found in grasslands where cattle have grazed. The fruit bodies resemble Psilocybe cubensis, but can be distinguished from that species by its buff-yellow to yellowish-brown cap that lacks an umbo, and the lack of a ring on the stipe. It is classified in section Caerulescentes of the genus Psilocybe. P.  chuxiongensis is one of 14 Psilocybe species found in China. In a molecular phylogenetic analysis of DNA sequences, P. chuxiongensis was most closely related to P. cubensis, grouping in a clade sister to P. allenii and P. cyanescens.

See also
List of psilocybin mushrooms
List of Psilocybe species

References

chuxiongensis
Fungi described in 2014
Fungi of China